Advanced Placement (AP) Physics 1, along with AP Physics 2, is a year-long AP course whose first exam was given in 2015. The course is intended to proxy a one-semester algebra-based university course. In its first five years, the exam covered forces and motion, conservation laws, waves, and electricity. As of the 2021 exam, AP Physics 1 includes mechanics topics only.

History
The heavily computational AP Physics B course served for four decades as the College Board's algebra-based offering. As part of the College Board's redesign of science courses, AP Physics B was discontinued; therefore, AP Physics 1 and 2 were created with guidance from the National Research Council and the National Science Foundation. The course covers material of a first-semester university undergraduate physics course offered at American universities that use best practices of physics pedagogy.  The first AP Physics 1 classes had begun in the 2014–2015 school year, with the first AP exams administered in May 2015.

Curriculum
AP Physics 1 is an algebra-based, introductory college-level physics course that includes mechanics topics such as motion, force, momentum, energy, harmonic motion, and rotation; The College Board published a curriculum framework that includes seven big ideas on which the AP Physics 1 and 2 courses are based, along with "enduring understandings" students are expected to acquire within each of the big ideas.:

Questions for the exam are constructed with direct reference to items in the curriculum framework. Student understanding of each topic is tested with reference to multiple skills—that is, questions require students to use quantitative, semi-quantitative, qualitative, and experimental reasoning in each content area.

Exam

Science Practices Assessed 
Multiple Choice and Free Response Sections of the AP® Physics 1 exam are also assessed on scientific practices. Below are tables representing the practices assessed and their weighting for both parts of the exam

Section 1: Multiple Choice

Score distributions 
The exam score distributions since 2015 are as follows:

This AP course has the lowest average score and the lowest proportion of students that score a 5 out of all current AP subjects.

See also
AP Physics

References

Advanced Placement
School qualifications
Gifted education
High school course levels
Physics education
Standardized tests